Saint-Julien-d'Arpaon is a former commune in the Lozère department in southern France. On 1 January 2016, it was merged into the new commune of Cans-et-Cévennes. Its population was 93 in 2019.

Saint-Julien-d'Arpaon stands at a crossing of the river Mimente on the Robert Louis Stevenson Trail (GR 70), a popular long-distance path following approximately the route travelled by Robert Louis Stevenson in 1878 and described in his book Travels with a Donkey in the Cévennes. Stevenson mentions the village and its ruined chateau in passing, though not by name:

See also
Communes of the Lozère department

References

Saintjuliendarpaon